Annette Auguste (also known as Sò Anne or Sò Ann,  – 17 April 2020) was a Haitian folk singer and activist.

Auguste was one of the founding members of Fanmi Lavalas. She was arrested by US Marines on 9 May 2004 and held in prison on claims of involvement in a December 2003 attack at the University of Haiti. Amnesty International called her a political prisoner and said that "Amnesty International believes that Annette Auguste is being held arbitrarily since the Haitian authorities have failed to produce any evidence to charge her and have failed to release her within the normal terms." Due to disagreements within Fanmi Lavalas, she left it and in 2015 ran for Senate with the Haitian Tèt Kale Party.

References

1940s births
2020 deaths
20th-century Haitian women singers
Haitian activists
Haitian Tèt Kale Party politicians